Aia Arena  is a stadium located in Kutaisi. is the home stadium of Rugby Club Aia Kutaisi. Aia Arena is able to hold 5,000 spectators. it is located in 9 ha Territory and includes 4 Field.

References 

Rugby union stadiums in Georgia (country)
Buildings and structures in Kutaisi